is a stadium in Aomori, Aomori Prefecture, Japan.

The stadium holds 10,010 people. The stadium was built in 1950 and was repaired in 2000.

On June 28, 1950, Hideo Fujimoto pitched a perfect game at the stadium. The stadium is not regularly used for Nippon Professional Baseball, but for high school baseball.

External links 
 Aomori City Baseball Stadium

Aomori Stadium
Sports venues in Aomori (city)
Sports venues completed in 1950
1950 establishments in Japan